Squamous cell carcinoma antigen recognized by T-cells 3 is a protein that in humans is encoded by the SART3 gene.

The protein encoded by this gene is an RNA-binding nuclear protein that is a tumor-rejection antigen. This antigen possesses tumor epitopes capable of inducing HLA-A24-restricted and tumor-specific cytotoxic T lymphocytes in cancer patients and may be useful for specific immunotherapy. This gene product is found to be an important cellular factor for HIV-1 gene expression and viral replication. It also associates transiently with U6 and U4/U6 snRNPs during the recycling phase of the spliceosome cycle. This encoded protein is thought to be involved in the regulation of mRNA splicing.

Interactions 

SART3 has been shown to interact with RNPS1 and Androgen receptor.

References

Further reading 

 
 
 
 
 
 
 
 
 
 
 
 
 
 
 
 

Spliceosome